Loons (North American English) or divers (British / Irish English) are a group of aquatic birds found in much of North America and northern Eurasia. All living species of loons are members of the genus Gavia, family Gaviidae and order Gaviiformes .

Description
Loons, which are the size of large ducks or small geese, resemble these birds in shape when swimming. Like ducks and geese, but unlike coots (which are Rallidae) and grebes (Podicipedidae), the loon's toes are connected by webbing. The loons may be confused with the cormorants (Phalacrocoracidae), but can be distinguished from them by their distinct call. Cormorants are not-too-distant relatives of loons, and like them are heavy-set birds whose bellies, unlike those of ducks and geese, are submerged when swimming. Loons in flight resemble plump geese with seagulls' wings that are relatively small in proportion to their bulky bodies. The bird points its head slightly upwards while swimming, but less so than cormorants. In flight, the head droops more than in similar aquatic birds.

Male and female loons have identical plumage, which is largely patterned black-and-white in summer, with grey on the head and neck in some species. All have a white belly. This resembles many sea-ducks (Merginae) – notably the smaller goldeneyes (Bucephala) – but is distinct from most cormorants, which rarely have white feathers, and if so, usually as large rounded patches rather than delicate patterns. All species of loons have a spear-shaped bill.

Males are larger on average, but relative size is only apparent when the male and female are together. In winter, plumage is dark grey above, with some indistinct lighter mottling on the wings, and a white chin, throat and underside. The specific species can then be distinguished by certain features, such as the size and colour of the head, neck, back and bill. But reliable identification of loons in winter is often difficult even for experts – particularly as the smaller immature birds look similar to winter-plumage adults, making size an unreliable means of identification.

Gaviiformes are among the few groups of birds in which the young moult into a second coat of down feathers after shedding the first one, rather than growing juvenile feathers with downy tips that wear off, as is typical in many birds. This trait is also found in tubenoses (Procellariiformes) and penguins (Sphenisciformes), both relatives of the loons.

Behaviour and ecology

Loons are excellent swimmers, using their feet to propel themselves above and under water. However, since their feet are located far back on the body, loons have difficulty walking on land, though they can effectively run short distances to reach water when frightened. Thus, loons avoid coming to land, except for mating and nesting. 

Loons fly strongly, though they have high wing loading (mass to wing area ratio), which complicates takeoff. Indeed, most species must run upwind across the water's surface with wings flapping to generate sufficient lift to take flight. Only the red-throated loon (G. stellata) can take off from land. Once airborne, loons are capable of long flights during migration. Scientists from the U.S. Geological Survey, who have implanted satellite transmitters in some individuals, have recorded daily flights of up to 1078 km in a 24-hour period, which probably resulted from single movements. North European loons migrate primarily via the South Baltic and directly over land to the Black Sea or Mediterranean. Loons can live as long as 30 years and can hold their breath for as long as 90 seconds while underwater.

Loons are migratory birds, and in the winter months they move from their northern freshwater lake nesting habitats to southern marine coastlines. They are well-adapted to this change in salinity, however, because they have special salt glands located directly above their eyes. These glands filter out salts in their blood and flushes this salty solution out through their nasal passages, which allows them to immediately consume fish from oceans and drink saltwater after their long migration.

Diet and feeding
Loons find their prey by sight. They eat mainly fish, supplemented with amphibians, crustaceans and similar mid-sized aquatic fauna. Specifically, they have been noted to feed on crayfish, frogs, snails, salamanders and leeches. They prefer clear lakes because they can more easily see their prey through the water. The loon uses its pointy bill to stab or grasp prey. They eat vertebrate prey headfirst to facilitate swallowing, and swallow all their prey whole.

To help digestion, loons swallow small pebbles from the bottoms of lakes. Similar to grit eaten by chickens, these gastroliths may assist the loon's gizzard in crushing the hard parts of the loon's food such as the exoskeletons of crustaceans and the bones of frogs and salamanders. The gastroliths may also be involved in stomach cleaning as an aid to regurgitation of indigestible food parts.

Loons may inadvertently ingest small lead pellets, released by anglers and hunters, that will contribute to lead poisoning and the loon's eventual death. Jurisdictions that have banned the use of lead shot and sinkers include but are not limited to Maine, New Hampshire, Vermont, some areas of Massachusetts, Yellowstone National Park, Great Britain, Canada, Michigan, and Denmark.

Reproduction
Loons nest during the summer on freshwater lakes and/or large ponds. Smaller bodies of water (up to 0.5 km2) will usually only have one pair. Larger lakes may have more than one pair, with each pair occupying a bay or section of the lake. The red-throated loon, however, may nest colonially, several pairs close together, in small Arctic tarns and feed at sea or in larger lakes, ferrying the food in for the young.

Loons mate on land, often on the future nest site, and build their nests close to the water, preferring sites that are completely surrounded by water such as islands or emergent vegetation. Loons use a variety of materials to build their nests including aquatic vegetation, pine needles, leaves, grass, moss and mud. Sometimes, nest material is almost lacking. Both male and female build the nest and incubate jointly for 28 days. If the eggs are lost, the pair may re-nest, usually in a different location. Since the nest is very close to the water, rising water may induce the birds to slowly move the nest upwards, over a metre.

Despite the roughly equal participation of the sexes in nest building and incubation, analysis has shown clearly that males alone select the location of the nest. This pattern has the important consequence that male loons, but not females, establish significant site-familiarity with their territories that allows them to produce more chicks there over time. Sex-biased site-familiarity might explain, in part, why resident males fight so hard to defend their territories.

Most clutches consist of two eggs, which are laid in May or June, depending upon latitude. Loon chicks are precocial, able to swim and dive right away, but will often ride on their parents' back during their first two weeks to rest, conserve heat, and avoid predators. Chicks are fed mainly by their parents for about six weeks but gradually begin to feed themselves over time. By 11 or 12 weeks, chicks gather almost all of their own food and have begun to fly. In 2019, a necropsy of a bald eagle found floating on a Maine lake (beside the floating body of a loon chick) found that the eagle had been stabbed through the heart by an adult loon's beak.

Biologists, especially from Chapman University, have extensively studied the mating behaviour of the common loon (G. immer). Contrary to popular belief, pairs seldom mate for life. Indeed, a typical adult loon is likely to have several mates during its lifetime because of territorial takeover. Each breeding pair must frequently defend its territory against "floaters" (territory-less adults) trying to evict at least one owner and seize the breeding site. Territories that have produced chicks in the past year are especially prone to takeovers, because nonbreeding loons use chicks as cues to indicate high-quality territories. One-third of all territorial evictions among males result in the death of the owner; in contrast, female loons usually survive. Birds that are displaced from a territory but survive usually try to re-mate and (re)claim a breeding territory later in life. 

In 2020, a loon hatched for the first time in over a century in Southeastern Massachusetts at Fall River, the Massachusetts Division of Fisheries and Wildlife and Biodiversity Research Institute. The chicks were relocated in 2015 with the hopes of re-establishing breeding and nesting patterns.

Etymology and taxonomy

The European Anglophone name "diver" comes from the bird's habit of catching fish by swimming calmly along the surface and then abruptly plunging into the water. The North American name "loon" likely comes from either the Old English word lumme, meaning lummox or awkward person, or the Scandinavian word lum meaning lame or clumsy. Either way, the name refers to the loon's poor ability to walk on land.

Another possible derivation is from the Norwegian word lom for these birds, which comes from Old Norse  lómr, possibly cognate with English "lament", referring to the characteristic plaintive sound of the loon. The scientific name Gavia refers to seabirds in general.

The scientific name Gavia was the Latin term for the smew (Mergellus albellus). This small sea-duck is quite unrelated to loons and just happens to be another black-and-white seabird which swims and dives for fish. It is not likely that the ancient Romans had much knowledge of loons, as these are limited to more northern latitudes and since the end of the last glacial period seem to have occurred only as rare winter migrants in the Mediterranean region.
 
The term gavia was transferred from the ducks to the loons only in the 18th century. Earlier naturalists referred to the loons as mergus (the Latin term for diving seabirds of all sorts) or colymbus, which became the genus name used in the first modern scientific description of a Gavia species (by Carl Linnaeus) in 1758. Unfortunately, confusion about whether Linnaeus' "wastebin genus" Colymbus referred to loons or grebes abounded. North American ornithologists used the genus name to refer to grebes, while Europeans used it for loons, following Nicholas Aylward Vigors and Richard Bowdler Sharpe.

The International Commission on Zoological Nomenclature tried to settle this issue in 1956 by declaring Colymbus a suppressed name unfit for further use and establishing Gavia, created by Johann Reinhold Forster in 1788, as the valid genus name for the loons. However, the situation was not completely resolved even then, and the following year the ICZN had to act again to prevent Louis Jean Pierre Vieillot's 1818 almost-forgotten family name Urinatoridae from overruling the much younger Gaviidae. Some eminent ornithologists such as Pierce Brodkorb tried to keep the debate alive, but the ICZN's solution has been satisfactory.

Systematics and evolution
All living species are placed in the genus Gavia. The evolutionary of the genus Gavia has been suggested to have originated from Europe during the Paleogene. The earliest species, G. egeriana, was found early Miocene deposits from Dolnice in the Czech Republic. During the remainder of the Miocene Gavia managed to dispersed into North America via the Atlantic coastlines eventually making their way to the continent's Pacific coastlines by the Late Miocene. The interrelationships of the extant species has found the red-throated loons being the most basal of the five species.

Fossil record

Nearly ten prehistoric species have been named to date in the genus Gavia, and about as many undescribed ones await further study. The genus is known from the Early Miocene onwards, and the oldest members them are rather small (some are smaller than the red-throated loon). Throughout the late Neogene, the genus by and large follows Cope's Rule.  

List of fossil Gavia species
 †G. brodkorbi Howard, 1978 (Late Miocene of Orange County, United States)
 †G. concinna Wetmore, 1940 (Late Miocene/Early Pliocene of west and east United States)
 †G. egeriana Švec, 1982 (Early Miocene of Czechoslovakia ?and Cheswold, Delaware, United States –? Yorktown Early Pliocene of Lee Creek Mine, North Carolina, United States)
 †G. fortis Olson & Rasmussen, 2001 (Yorktown Early Pliocene of Lee Creek Mine, North Carolina, United States)
 †G. howardae Brodkorb, 1953 (San Diego Formation, California and Yorktown Formation, North Carolina
 †G. moldavica Kessler, 1984 (Late Miocene of Chişinău, Moldova)
 †G. palaeodytes Wetmore, 1943 (Bone Valley Early/Middle Pliocene of Pierce, Florida, United States)
 †G. paradoxa Umanska, 1981 (Late Miocene of Čebotarevka, Ukraine)
 †G. schultzi Mlíkovský, 1998 (Middle Miocene of Sankt Margarethen, Austria)

List of fossil Gavia specimens
 Gavia sp. (Early-Middle Miocene of eastern United States)
 Gavia sp. (Calvert Middle Miocene ?or Pleistocene of Maryland, United States) – same as Gavia cf. immer below?
 Gavia spp. (Middle Miocene of Steinheim, Germany) – three species
 Gavia sp. (Early Pliocene of Empoli, Italy)
 Gavia sp. (Early Pliocene of Kerč Peninsula, Ukraine)
 Gavia cf. concinna (San Diego Middle/Late Pliocene of San Diego, California, United States) – two species?
 Gavia sp. (Early Pleistocene of Kairy, Ukraine)
 Gavia cf. immer (Pleistocene of California and Florida, United States) – possibly a G. immer paleosubspecies

"Gavia" portisi from the Late Pliocene of Orciano Pisano, Italy, is known from a cervical vertebra that may or may not have been from a loon. If so, it was from a bird slightly smaller than the common loon. Older authors were quite sure the bone was indeed from a Gavia and even considered G. concinna a possibly junior synonym of it. This is now regarded as rather unlikely due to the quite distinct range and age. The Early Pliocene Gavia skull from Empoli (Italy) was referred to G. concinna, and thus could conceivably have been of "G." portisi if that was indeed a loon. The holotype vertebra may now be lost, which would make "G." portisi a nomen dubium.

In popular culture
Various Indigenous myths from the California region have a recurring figure, Loon or Loon Woman, based on the common loon.
The common loon is the provincial bird of Ontario and is depicted on the Canadian one-dollar coin, which has come to be known affectionately as the "loonie".
The common loon is the official state bird of Minnesota.
Mercer, Wisconsin, promotes itself as the "Loon Capital of the World".
Henry David Thoreau describes a playful and inspiring acquaintance with a loon on Walden Pond in his book Walden.
The Great Lakes Loons are a minor-league professional baseball team based in Midland, Michigan, United States. The primary mascot is Lou E. Loon.
The Warner Bros./Amblin cartoon Tiny Toon Adventures features Shirley the Loon, who speaks with a thick Valley girl accent and is obsessed with superficial New Age paraphernalia. She is voiced by Saturday Night Live cast member Gail Matthius.
The Major League Soccer club Minnesota United FC use a loon in the club's crest, as well as a nickname for the team.
Thanks to its inclusion as a preset in the E-mu Emulator, a specific sample of a Canadian loon, notably heard in "Sueño Latino" (1989) and in 808 State’s "Pacific State" (1989), has become a recurring motif in electronic-based popular music.

References

Bibliography

 
 
 
 Montana Fish, Wildlife & Parks (Montana FW&P) (2007): Animal Field Guide: Common Loon; retrieved 2007-05-12.
 
 

 
 United States Fish and Wildlife Service (USFWS) (2005): Common Loons at Seney NWR (June 2005), fws.gov; accessed July 6, 2017.

Recordings
Voices of the Loon, Robert J. Lurtsema, narrator. recorded by William E. Barklow. North American Loon Fund/National Audubon Society. (1980)

External links

 Tree of Life Gaviidae
 Loon sounds
 Loon videos  on the Internet Bird Collection
 The Loon Project website
 Loon Preservation Committee
 Diving Birds of North America by Paul Johnsgard
 Loon Dreaming - an animated short from the National Film Board of Canada

Articles containing video clips
Extant Eocene first appearances
 
Priabonian first appearances
Taxa named by Johann Reinhold Forster
he:צוללן (עוף)